Nacomis Indian Rancheria is an unincorporated community in Mendocino County, California. It lies at an elevation of 768 feet (234 m).

References

Unincorporated communities in California
Unincorporated communities in Mendocino County, California
Native American populated places